Abby Chava Stein (born October 1, 1991) is an American transgender author, activist, blogger, model, speaker, and rabbi. She is the first openly transgender woman raised in a Hasidic community, and is a direct descendant of Hasidic Judaism's founder, the Baal Shem Tov. In 2015, she founded the first support group nationwide for trans people of Orthodox Jewish background.

Stein is also the first woman, and the first openly transgender woman, to have been ordained by an Orthodox Judaism institution, having received her rabbinical degree in 2011, before coming out as transgender. Though Stein did not work as a rabbi after leaving Orthodox Judaism until at least 2016, by 2020, she had re-embraced her title as rabbi, and currently works in many capacities as a rabbi. In 2018, she co-founded Sacred Space, a multi-faith project "which celebrates women and non-binary people of all faith traditions".

Early life
Stein was born in 1991 in Williamsburg, Brooklyn, in New York City, the 6th child in a family of 13, born to a family of notable Hasidic leaders; she has five elder sisters. Her father, Rabbi Menachem Mendel Stein, is the current Savraner Rebbe of Brooklyn. Her grandfather, Grand Rabbi Mordechai Stein, is the current Faltishaner Rabbe, and is a descendant of Reb Mordechai Twersky (1770–1837). Her family is of Polish, Ukrainian/Romanian, Serbian, and Israeli descent, with modern Ukraine being the predominant origin.

Stein grew up speaking Yiddish and Hebrew, and was educated at a traditional all-boys Jewish Day School. The community in which she grew up is highly segregated by gender, impacting almost all aspects of daily life. Stein attended the Viznitz yeshiva in Kiamesha Lake, Upstate New York, for her high school education, also receiving ordination as a rabbi there in 2011. In 2012, she left the Hasidic community (often referred to in Jewish communities as going "off the derech"), and in 2014, she started school at Columbia University's School of General Studies.

In her book, as well as in numerous interviews, Stein credits the New York City based non-profit Footsteps with helping her succeed after she left the Hasidic community, even calling their work "life saving." In a March 2021 interview with the New York magazine, she credits Footsteps therapists with helping her, both when she left the Hasidic community, and later when she came out as transgender women, saying that speaking with a Footsteps social worker "was the first time I ever spoke to a professional where I felt listened to, as opposed to feeling like a problem that needed solving."

Coming out

In November 2015, Stein made headlines when she came out on her blog as transgender, and started physical transition. She was featured in some major media outlets, including The New York Times, the New York Post, New York Magazine, NBC, the Daily Dot, and more. She has also appeared on CNN, Fox News, HuffPost Live, and Vice Canada.
Stein also appeared on a number of international TV networks, and in numerous international newspapers and magazines in over 20 different languages.

When Stein left her community in 2012 and came out as an atheist, her parents said that no matter Stein's choices in life, she would remain their child; however, after coming out as trans, her father told her that, "You should know that this means I might not be able to talk to you ever again." Since then, her parents have shunned her, and stopped talking to her altogether. She has also received some hate from her former community, though in an interview with Chasing News (a Fox News Short film company), Stein said that she received less hate than some people would have expected. She described her life post-transition as "better than I could have ever imagined".

Stein was featured in the 2016 Showtime Documentary series, Dark Net, in episode 8, "Revolt".

Naming Celebration/bat mitzvah
On June 4, 2016, Stein celebrated her transition and announced her name change to Abby Chava Stein at Romemu, a Jewish Renewal synagogue in the Upper West Side neighborhood of New York City. In an interview with The Huffington Post, she said that even though she did not believe in God, she wanted to celebrate in a synagogue:

Publications

Books
Stein's first book, Becoming Eve: My Journey from Ultra Orthodox Rabbi to Transgender Woman, a memoir, was published by Seal Press (Hachette) on November 12, 2019. The book became a best seller.

Becoming Eve has been translated into Dutch, and was published under the title "Eigenlijk Eva: Mijn transitie van ultraorthodoxe rabbi tot trans-vrouw" by De Geus on January 18, 2022.

Stein's second book, Sources of Pride, an anthology of Jewish texts on "Identity, Gender, Sexuality, and Inclusivity, in Jewish Texts from the Torah to Kabbalah, Hasidic Teachings, and Contemporary Sources." The book will be a collection of her source sheets on Sefaria. It is to be published in 2023 by Ben Yehuda Press.

Stein was profiled in, and wrote the foreword for, Peter Bussian's book of portraits, Trans New York: Photos and Stories of Transgender New Yorkers. In the foreword, she described her love for New York City – both while in the Hasidic community, and now living as a Queer person in New York.

Essays
Her writings have also been published in Queer Disbelief: Why LGBTQ Equality is an Atheist Issue, written by Camille Beredjick, edited by Hemant Mehta, and published by Friendly Atheist. Stein wrote an essay specifically for the book, titled, Trans Woman (and Former Hasidic Jew): Atheists Should Support the LGBTQ Movement.

Stein's essay about COVID-19 and its impact on the LGBTQ community, titled, "COVID has exploded Jewish LGBTQ acceptance online. There's no going back." (originally published on Forward.com,) was included in When We Turned Within: Reflections on COVID-19, an anthology of 165 essays edited by Sarah Tuttle-Singer and Menachem Creditor.

Another one of Stein's essays on the current political climate, titled "When One Line Makes All the Difference" - reflecting on President Joe Biden's victory speech (on November 7, 2020), and his mentioning of the transgender community (originally published online by T'ruah (of which Stein is a rabbinic member), as part of their "Torah 20/20" series.) - was published in the 2021 anthology No Time for Neutrality: American Rabbinic Voices from an Era of Upheaval.

Stein's essay titled "Bring Them In," based on her remarks as part of the 24 hour "Call To Unite," hosted by Tim Shriver and Oprah Winfrey, was published in The Call to Unite.

Stein also contributed to Jewels of Elul: A Letter to Myself XII, a collection of essays published by singer / songwriter and music producer, Craig Taubman. Her essay, titled, "Dayeinu" ("Enough" in Hebrew), focused on the question of "What If?", and explored an answer to the question of "What If you would have been" born or raised in different circumstances.

Stein also contributed an essay to Kaye Blegvad's The Pink Book: An Illustrated Celebration of the Color, from Bubblegum to Battleships, discussing her relationship with the color pink, the Hasidic community and the color, and her feelings about stereotypical femininity.

Online essays
 "‘I Was Raised a Hasidic Man. When I Came Out as a Woman, the Sexism Shocked Me’" a piece about sexism, both in the Hasidic community, and her experience with sexism after coming out. Published in Glamour Magazine.
 "On the Set of ‘Unorthodox,’ I Brushed Up Against My Hasidic Past" about her experience on set of the Unorthodox TV show, where she played a Hasidic woman, wearing a traditional head covering for Jewish women. Published in Alma.
 "Makah/Plague of the Binary" a poem about the "plague" of the gender binary and binary thinking as a whole, counting 10 plagues. It was published by the Jewish Book Council as part of a project of 10 authors and artists responding to 10 modern plagues, for Passover 2021, the second Passover of the COVID-19 pandemic.
 "What I hope we learn from two Passovers in social distancing exile" a prose style piece about celebrating the second Passover with Covid restrictions. Published in the Jewish Daily Forward's Scribe.

Activism
After coming out, Stein started an online support group to help trans people who come from Orthodox backgrounds. Stein also said that Facebook and online support communities have been her lifeline while leaving her community, which made her realize the positive power of online communities.

In December 2015, Stein founded a support group for trans people from Orthodox backgrounds. The group's first meeting had 12 people attending, most of them fellow Hasids struggling with their gender identity. Stein's avid blogging also gained her a big following in the Jewish community, and she has become a role model for former ultra-Orthodox Jews – both LGBTQ and not.

In addition to transgender activism, Stein has also been active in several projects to help those going off the derech and leaving the ultra-Orthodox community. She has been working with Footsteps, and its Canadian sister organization, Forward, for which she traveled to Montreal in 2016 to help jump-start. In addition, she has also done some lay advocacy work with YAFFED, working towards a better education in the Hasidic schools, for which she has also engaged in political work.

In 2018, Stein co-founded her own feminist/womanist multi-faith and inclusive celebration of women and non-binary people of all faith traditions, called Sacred Space, with former Mormon feminist and founder of Ordain Women, human rights lawyer Kate Kelly, and Yale Divinity School professor and Baptist preacher Eboni Marshall-Turman.

During the 2020 Democratic Party presidential primaries, Stein served as a national Surrogate for the Bernie Sanders campaign.

Stein is a member of the Democratic Socialists of America.

Modeling
Since coming out, Stein has also done several modeling projects depicting her life and transition, which have been published by numerous sites. She told Refinery29 that "I actually liked [shooting]. It did help me feel more comfortable", and that she does these projects to encourage others on their journey. In 2018, she also did several photo shoots and modeling projects with major fashion magazines such as Vogue, Glamour, Elle, and InStyle.

In December 2021 Stein was photographed by Annie Leibovitz as part of Celebrity Cruises' "industry-elevating" All-Inclusive Photo Project. The Project, which according to CNN was "some of the world's most innovative artists and photographers teaming up with a cruise line in a bid to help change the face of travel marketing" was according to Celebrity Cruises "starting a movement to address under-representation in travel marketing through our All-Inclusive Photo Project. In partnership with world-renowned photographers, we have created the world’s first open-source photo library featuring ethnic, disabled, curvy and LGBTQ+ changemakers. We invite our industry to join us in changing the face of travel." Stein said about that shoot that “while I don’t understand corporate intentions, the people I worked with from Celebrity were all really, really amazing and they really mean it. I think they’ve done a lot of amazing stuff towards being more inclusive and I’m a big fan of inclusivity. Specifically, actual actions.”

Stein's photo from that shoot was printed in The New York Times Sunday edition on Sunday April 24, 2022, as a double page centerfold feature in the main section.

Public speaking

Stein's first public appearance was in a promotional video for Footsteps 10th anniversary gala in 2013, where she was interviewed about her experience leaving the ultra-Orthodox Jewish community. Around the same time, she also did interviews with The Wall Street Journal and Haaretz about her experience leaving the community and fighting for custody. She also started giving public speeches on these topics.

In addition to public speaking, she also teaches classes on gender within Judaism, as well as bringing attention to trans people from Orthodox communities. As of November 2016, she has had speeches at several universities. She has also done longer speaking tours to several communities in Montreal, the San Francisco Bay Area, and the New York metropolitan area.

Starting in 2016, Stein has also become a rising star in demand for speaking engagements and conferences, such as the Limmud franchise, where, at the 2017 Limmud NY conference, she spoke more times than any other presenter. At the same time, she has also spoken internationally at conferences such as the American Jewish Joint Distribution Committee's annual Junction Conference in Berlin, and the Miles Nadal JCC's Tikkun in Toronto.

A big part of Stein's events have been with Hillel International affiliates all over the world. According to a 2017 report by Hillel, "Stein has visited more than 100 campuses, sharing her story with thousands of students, in hopes of teaching them the importance of inclusivity, and that 'Judaism and queerness are not a contradiction'." Her events drew hundreds of students, where she talks about her life, Transgender in Judaism, Intersectionality, policy, and politics, as it relates to the LGBTQ community, and consulting on how to be more inclusive.

Stein is today a globally recognized author, activist, and speaker. As of July 2020, she has given over 400 speeches at venues worldwide.

Women's March leadership

In early 2019, Stein joined the Women's March leadership, as a member of the 2019 Steering Committee. Despite some controversy surrounding the March and its leadership, Stein said that, "I'm convinced that working with Women's March people, we can gain so much more by working together, even when there might be some parts we feel uncomfortable with", and "expressed solidarity with other Jewish women who are supporting the march on grounds that it has emerged as an important and growing coalition of marginalized groups, including Jews, African Americans, Hispanics, and LGBT people".

During the rally following the march, Stein also spoke on stage alongside Reverend Jacqui Lewis, senior minister of Middle Collegiate Church, and Muslim activist Remaz Abdelgader, leading the spiritual invocation opening the rally. During her speech, which she started with the traditional greeting of "Shabbat Shalom", she related the march to the Exodus, leading the audience in chants denouncing different forms of prejudice and oppression, with a chant of "Let It Go!". She also called for unity, saying that, "A lot of people out there, a lot of people in the media are trying to divide us. What brings us together is not the fact that we are all the same. What brings us together is our differences."

In 2020, Stein was a featured speaker at the Women's March NYC, in Foley Square.

Rabbinical work
For a few years after leaving the Hasidic community, and later coming out, Stein did not work as a rabbi at all. About the first 2 years after leaving she told HuffPost "I felt very much disenfranchised from God. One rabbi called it “Post-God Traumatic Disorder.” When God is just this really bad person who is going to punish you. I was like, “That’s it. I don’t want to know anything about the Jewish religion. This is all bulls**t.” Later on, she started practicing Judaism again, saying “I don’t believe in God, but I believe in Judaism,” naming specifically Jewish 
and Jewish year cycle, as well as Jewish Music, food, and spirituality, as details that made her reembrace some Jewish practices. About celebrating Shabbat she said that while she isn't observant in an Orthodox sense, marking Shabbat with simple rituals such as candle lighting helped ground her when she was going through a hard time before coming out, and that "it became a mental health and spiritual practice." On her social media she posts almost weekly posts of her celebrating Shabbat.

By 2019 she has re-embraced her title and work as a rabbi, leaning into the knowledge she got in her training to advance LGBTQ right and social justice." She also said that “I have found that even the most secular Jews have a certain type of respect when you say, ‘rabbi,’”, and she has used that ability to talk more about how Judaism and Jewish texts have space for queer and trans people, saying that “While I don’t think that we need text to justify who we are…I do think that [texts] create something so beautiful and powerful.” While making a video teaching Jewish texts with the Jewish Daily Forward, she said that “I’m hoping that looking at these texts and sharing them could help us all, if we wish, to find a space for us within Judaism to learn not to tolerate who we are, but to celebrate who we are.” Stein also partnered with the Yiddish Forverts to create content in her native Yiddish on the topic of gender and transgender in Judaism.

Stein currently serves in the capacity of a rabbi on NCJW's "Rabbis for Repro" board, overseeing "a network of Jewish clergy who have pledged to preach, teach, and advocate for abortion justice," which currently has over 1,500 members.

Stein is an active member of the rabbinical group T'ruah: The Rabbinic Call for Human Rights, as well as a member of the rabbinical advocacy group "Tirdof: New York Jewish Clergy for Justice" which is a partnership between T'ruah and Jews for Racial and Economic Justice (JFREJ).

A February 2022 article in Distractify claimed that the Transgender Rabbi character (played by Hari Nef) in episode 10 of And Just Like That… was based on Stein.

Honors and awards

 The Jewish Week 36 Under 36. In 2016, she was named by The Jewish Week as one of the "36 Under 36" young Jews who changed the world; she is the first Trans person ever to get this award.
 Footsteps Leadership Award. At the 2016 Footsteps Celebrates She received a leadership award for "Her outstanding leadership in advancing Footsteps stories in literature and Voice".
 New York Magazine 50 Reasons to Love New York. In 2015, the New York Magazine counted her story as one of the 50 reasons to love New York, saying that New Yorkers are overly accepting of trans people.
 9 Jewish LGBTQ Activists You Should Know. In June 2016, she was named by The Times of Israel and the Jewish Telegraphic Agency as one of the nine "most influential Jews who have helped make LGBTQ issues visible and are still working to enact change".
 Faith Leaders Leading the Fight for LGBTQ Equality. In October 2017, for LGBT History Month, she was named by the Human Rights Campaign, as one of 9 "faith leaders who are also leading the fight for LGBTQ equality".
 CAFE 100. In April 2018, Stein was named by former US Attorney Preet Bharara, as part of the inaugural "CAFE 100 – extraordinary change-makers who are taking action to address some of the most pressing problems in America and around the world".
 LGBTQ Pride Award. During Pride month in June 2018, Stein was honored by Brooklyn Borough President Eric Adams as part of "a special group of LGBTQ New Yorkers", honoring her work within the LGBTQ, and especially the formerly Hasidic LGBTQ, community.
 14 Jews Who Changed Queer History Forever. In June 2019, Stein was named by Alma as one of 14 "Jews who have changed queer history forever". Alongside Jazz Jennings, Rabbi Sandra Lawson, Leslie Feinberg, Magnus Hirschfeld, and others.
 9 LGBTQ Faith Leaders to Watch in 2019. In September 2019, Stein was named by the Center for American Progress as one of 9 LGBTQ faith leaders, whose "leadership in the current moment makes them critical faith leaders to watch in 2019 and beyond". According to a press release by CAP, "these extraordinary leaders have proposed powerful visions to reform the criminal justice system, advance climate justice, dismantle systemic racism, and more".
 Forward 50. In December 2019, Stein was named by The Forward as one of the 50 American Jews "Who Influenced, Intrigued, And Inspired Us This Year". In it, Stein also described her commitment to lighting Shabbat candles.
 10 Women You Need to Know This Women's History Month. In March 2020, for Women's History Month, Stein was named by Moment Magazine as one of 10 "powerful and inspiring women who work hard to create change and make an impact". Alongside Martha Nussbaum, Roberta Kaplan, Alice Shalvi, and Dr. Ruth.
 The World's Top 50 Thinkers. In July 2020, Stein was named by the Prospect Magazine as one of "The World's top 50 Thinkers in the COVID-19 Age". The list, which, according to Forbes, "is a much-anticipated exercise by the influential British magazine", called Stein a "renegade New York political science college student, and finally 27-year-old globally recognised author and advocate".
 Best Nonfiction Debut. In September 2020, Stein's book, Becoming Eve, was awarded the Best Non-Fiction Debut award, as part of Alma's "The Best Jewish Books of 5780" (AM). Saying that "not only is Abby a trailblazer and ridiculously inspiring — she's a really talented writer".
 10 LGBTQ+ American Jews Who've Made History. During Pride Month 2021, Stein was named by Hillel International as one of "10 LGBTQ+ American Jews Who've Made History." Alongside Leslie Feinberg, Kate Bornstein, Lesley Gore, Rabbi Elliot Kukla, Michael Twitty, and others.

American Jewish Press Association Rockower Award, First place Award for Excellence in Personality Profiles. In the 2019 awards, Simi Horowitz's profile of Stein, "Abby Stein: A Gender Transition Through a Jewish Lens", in the Moment Magazine Received the first place award for Excellence in Personality Profiles. The AJPA commented by saying that, "This piece captures the humanity of Abby Stein, with an abundance of quietly telling details (like what she's eating during the interview). An impressive work."

Filmography
In addition to a long list of interviews with major national and international news networks, Stein has also been featured in several TV segments in the United States, Canada, Israel, Bulgaria, and more – in English, French, Hebrew, Bulgarian, Russian, Spanish, and Yiddish.

Personal life
In 2010, Stein married a woman, Fraidy Horowitz, with whom she also had her son, Duvid. The marriage was an arranged marriage by a matchmaker, and the couple only met for 15 minutes prior to the engagement. "Abby's sheltered upbringing culminated in her marriage at 18 to Fraidy, the daughter of another Hasidic Jewish family. It was formally arranged by a matchmaker, and was, in Abby's words, a 'done deal' before they had even met. 'It wasn't exactly forced, but it was completely arranged', she said. 'I met her once in advance, for 15 minutes.' The two did not see each other again until their wedding. As Stein left the community, she divorced her wife. In an interview with The Wall Street Journal right after her divorce, she said that, "They had a good relationship", and that at the time of the divorce, she was able to "obtain a 'normal agreement', including weekly visits, joint custody, split holidays, joint decision-making on major life events, and every second weekend with her son".

Stein is a cousin of the actor Luzer Twersky.

In a 2023 piece Stein wrote for Autostraddle, she identified her sexuality "as an out and proud queer, poly demisexual."

See also
 Transgender rights movement
 Trans woman
 LGBT culture in New York City
 List of LGBT people from New York City
 List of LGBT Jews
 Transgender people and religion

Notes

References

External links 

 
 
 "Happy Pride! Meet the Women Celebrating Across the Country" an interview with Abby on Yahoo style for Pride Month 2016.

life cycle
1991 births
21st-century American women writers
Members of the Democratic Socialists of America
Queer women
Former Orthodox Jews
LGBT Orthodox Jews
American LGBT rights activists
LGBT people from New York (state)
LGBT rabbis
Living people
Transgender rights activists
Columbia University School of General Studies alumni
Writers from Brooklyn
People from Williamsburg, Brooklyn
Jewish American atheists
American people of Ukrainian-Jewish descent
Transgender Jews
Transfeminists
Activists from New York (state)
Descendants of the Baal Shem Tov
Female models from New York (state)
Models from New York City
Jewish female models
Transgender female models
American female models
Yiddish-speaking people
Women's March
Jewish women writers
Jewish American writers
New York (state) socialists
Vizhnitz (Hasidic dynasty) members
Orthodox Jewish feminists
LGBT Jews
American transgender writers